The Maranon antshrike (Thamnophilus shumbae) is a passerine bird in the family Thamnophilidae. This non-migratory bird is native to Peru.

Etymology 
The specific name "shumbae" derives from the locality of Shumba, Cajamarca, Peru.

Taxonomy 
This species was previously classified as being a subspecies as T. bernardi, the collared antshrike.

Description 
Thamnophilus shumbae are usually between 15 and 16 cm. They display significant sexual dimorphism. Males are observed to have a black throat, upper breast, and head with their bills being speckled in white. The crown on females is said to be entirely rufous.

Distribution and habitat 
The species is said to inhabit in lowland tropical and subtropical deciduous forest. They are also thought to occur in riparian zones and shrubland. They are found in the basin of Marañón River in Peru. The maximum in which the Maranon antshrike occurs is 1,000 m.

See also 
 Collared antshrike - a closely related bird species

References 

Thamnophilus